The large moth subfamily Lymantriinae contains the following genera beginning with E:

References 

Lymantriinae
Lymantriid genera E